Xue Yuqun (2 November 1931 – 29 June 2021) was a Chinese hydrogeologist. He was an academician of the Chinese Academy of Sciences.

Biography
Xue was born into a wealthy and highly educated family in the town of Yuqi, Wuxi, Jiangsu, on 2 November 1931. His uncle  was a politician. His uncle Sun Yefang was an economist. His elder female cousin  is a microbiologist. His younger male cousin  is a physicist and member of the Chinese Academy of Engineering. He secondary studied at Private Wuxi High School (now Wuxi No.3 High School). In 1949, he was accepted to Tangshan Institute of Technology (now Southwest Jiaotong University). After graduating in 1952, he joined Nanjing University as an assistant. In 1955, he entered Changchun Institute of Geology (now Jilin University), studying geology with the tutor of Moscow Institute of Geological Exploration. He was a visiting scholar at the University of Arizona between 1982 and 1984. He was promoted to associate professor in 1986. He died of illness in Shanghai, on 29 June 2021, aged 89.

Honours and awards
 1999 Member of the Chinese Academy of Sciences (CAS)

References

1931 births
2021 deaths
People from Wuxi
Scientists from Jiangsu
Southwest Jiaotong University alumni
Jilin University alumni
Academic staff of Nanjing University
Members of the Chinese Academy of Sciences